Jorge Luís Andrade da Silva (born 21 April 1957), known as Andrade, is a Brazilian professional football coach and former player who played as a defensive midfielder. He spent the majority of his career for Flamengo in the 1970s and '80s, where he won several trophies, including four national championships and the Copa Libertadores.

As a coach, Andrade won the 2009 Campeonato Brasileiro with Flamengo.

Career
From 1977 to 1987 he played for Flamengo, taking part in the club's Golden Age and winning four Rio de Janeiro State Championships, three Brazilian Championships (1980, 1982, 1983), the 1981 Copa Libertadores and the 1981 Intercontinental Cup.

With 569 matches for Flamengo, Andrade has the 5th most appearances for the club.

Soon after his glorious era in Flamengo, he moved to AS Roma and then Vasco da Gama winning the 1989 Brazilian Championship. In the early 1980s he played for the Brazil national football team.

At international level, Andrade represented the Brazil national football team at the 1983 Copa América; he also won a silver medal in the 1988 Summer Olympics.

Andrade and Zinho are the only Brazilian players who have won four national titles.

After a period as Flamengo's assistant coach, including working as interim coach in four occasions, Andrade finally had a chance as head coach replacing Cuca, sacked by the club's directors, and won the 2009 Brazilian Championship, after 17 years of Flamengo's waiting.

International goals
Scores and results list Brazil's goal tally first.

Career statistics

Coaching

Honors
As a Player
Flamengo
Campeonato Brasileiro Série A: 3
1980, 1982, 1983

Copa União Green Module: 1
1987

 Copa Libertadores: 1
 1981

 Copa Intercontinental: 1
 1981

 Campeonato Carioca: 4
 1978, 1979, 1981, 1986

Vasco
Campeonato Brasileiro Série A: 1
1989

As a Coach
Flamengo
 Campeonato Brasileiro Série A: 1
 2009

References

 Much of the content of this article comes from the equivalent Portuguese-language Wikipedia article

External links
 Futpédia 

1957 births
Living people
Brazilian footballers
Brazilian football managers
Brazil international footballers
Footballers at the 1988 Summer Olympics
Olympic footballers of Brazil
Olympic silver medalists for Brazil
Brazilian expatriate footballers
Expatriate footballers in Italy
Expatriate footballers in Venezuela
Campeonato Brasileiro Série A players
Serie A players
Venezuelan Primera División players
Olympic medalists in football
1983 Copa América players
Copa Libertadores-winning players
Campeonato Brasileiro Série A managers
Campeonato Brasileiro Série B managers
Campeonato Brasileiro Série C managers
CR Flamengo footballers
A.S. Roma players
CR Vasco da Gama players
Esporte Clube Internacional de Lages players
Club Athletico Paranaense players
Desportiva Ferroviária players
CE Operário Várzea-Grandense players
Boavista Sport Club players
Bangu Atlético Clube players
CR Flamengo managers
Brasiliense Futebol Clube managers
Paysandu Sport Club managers
Boavista Sport Club managers
Medalists at the 1988 Summer Olympics
Association football midfielders
Esporte Clube São João da Barra managers